Donald Jeffrey Little is a former Major League Baseball pitcher. He pitched in a total of 40 games, including two starts.

References

External links
, or Retrosheet, or Pura Pelota
 

1954 births
Living people
Arkansas Travelers players
Baseball players from Ohio
Decatur Commodores players
Great Falls Giants players
Lafayette Drillers players
Major League Baseball pitchers
Minnesota Twins players
Nashua Pirates players
Orlando Twins players
People from Fremont, Ohio
Phoenix Giants players
Springfield Redbirds players
St. Louis Cardinals players
Tigres de Aragua players
American expatriate baseball players in Venezuela
Toledo Mud Hens players
Waterbury Giants players